A special situation in finance is an atypical event which has the high potential to alter the future course of a business, materially impacting the company's value. The connotation of the event may be both positive (for example, merger or acquisition) and negative (conflict, distress, etc.) The notion also covers corporate restructuring and corporate transactions, such as spin-offs, share repurchases, security issuance/repurchase, asset sales, or other catalyst-oriented situations. Further, a shareholders conflict  is also considered a special situation.

Seeking for and investing in special situations is a strategy pursued by a number of investors. To take advantage of a special situation, a hedge fund manager must identify an upcoming event that will increase or decrease the value of the company's equity and equity-related instruments.

Definition 
There is also a definition of special situation by Benjamin Graham:

Classes of special situations
In his well-known book Security Analysis, Benjamin Graham divides special situations into six classes: 
Class A: Standard arbitrages, based on a reorganization, recapitalization or merger plan
Class B: Cash payout, in recapitalization or mergers
Class C: Cash payments on sale or liquidation
Class D: Litigated matters
Class E: Public utility breakups
Class F: Miscellaneous special situations

See also
Alternative investments
Bankruptcy
Default (finance)
Distressed securities
Going concern

References

External links
What's Special About Special Situations Fixed Income?
Special Situation Survey by Forbes
Goldman Special Situation Profit Seen at Risk With Volcker Rule
Fund.com Special Situations Tracker

Hedge funds
Alternative investment management companies
Institutional investors